Mukhlid Mahil Al-Otaibi (born 20 June 1976), occasionally spelled as Moukhled Al Outaibi, is a Saudi Arabian long-distance runner who specializes in long-distance track and road running events. He represented his country at three Summer Olympics, in 2008, 2012, and 2016. He was the oldest member of Saudi Arabia's 2016 Olympic team.

Running career
Al-Otaibi finished second overall in the 5000 metres at the 1999 Asian Junior Athletics Championships.  He ran at his first Olympic competition when he raced in the men's 5000 metres at the 2008 Summer Olympics. At the 2012 Summer Olympics, he ran both the 5000 metres and the 10,000 metres. At the 2016 Summer Olympics, he ran in the men's 5000 metres.

Achievements

Personal bests
1500 metres - 3:38.12 min (2004)
3000 metres - 7:46.31 min (2004)
5000 metres - 12:58.58 min (2005)
 10000 metres - 27.31.61 min (2012)

References

External links

1976 births
Living people
Saudi Arabian male long-distance runners
Athletes (track and field) at the 2008 Summer Olympics
Athletes (track and field) at the 2012 Summer Olympics
Athletes (track and field) at the 2016 Summer Olympics
Olympic athletes of Saudi Arabia
Asian Games medalists in athletics (track and field)
Athletes (track and field) at the 2002 Asian Games
Athletes (track and field) at the 2010 Asian Games
People from Taif
Asian Games gold medalists for Saudi Arabia
Medalists at the 2002 Asian Games
Islamic Solidarity Games competitors for Saudi Arabia
Islamic Solidarity Games medalists in athletics
20th-century Saudi Arabian people
21st-century Saudi Arabian people